{{Infobox television
| image                = 誰是被害者 第一季 The Victims' Game 2020 TV series.jpg
| caption              =
| alt_name             = 
| native_name          = 
| genre                = 
 Drama
 Thriller
| based_on             = {{Based on|The Fourth Victim|INFINITY}}
| creator              = Chien Shih-keng
| developer            = Monomyth Co., Ltd.
| writer               = 
 Liang Shu-ting
 Hsu Ruei-liang
| director             = 
 David Chuang
 Chen Kuan-chung
| creative_director    = 
| presenter            = 
| starring             = 
 Joseph Chang
 Wei-ning Hsu
 Shih-hsien Wang
| judges               = 
| voices               = 
| narrated             = 
| theme_music_composer = MUSDM
| opentheme            = 
| endtheme             = One Who Will (Find Me) by 
| composer             = 
| country              = Taiwan
| language             = 
 Mandarin
 Taiwanese Hokkien
| num_seasons          = 1
| num_episodes         = 8
| list_episodes        = 
| executive_producer   = Tseng Han-hsien
| producer             = 
 Phil Tang
 Hsu Kuo-lun
 Hsu Wen-hsiung
| editor               = 
 Shieh Meng-ju
 Chiang Yi-ning
| location             = 
| cinematography       = 
| camera               = 
| runtime              = 62-67 minutes
| company              = 
Third Man Entertainment Co., Ltd.
Greener Grass Production Co., Ltd.
Taiwan Mobile Co., Ltd.
| distributor          = Netflix
| channel              = Netflix
| picture_format       = 
| audio_format         = 
| first_aired          = 
| last_aired           = 
| preceded_by          = 
| followed_by          = 
| related              =  
}}The Victims' Game is a 2020 Taiwanese Netflix original series starring Joseph Chang, Ann Hsu and Jason Wang. The plot revolves around the forensic scientist with Asperger's syndrome Fang Yi-jen (Joseph Chang) and the investigative journalist Hsu Hai-yin (Ann Hsu), investigating a case involving Fang Yi-jen's daughter. Season 2 was announced in September 2020 and is scheduled to premiere in 2022.

Cast
 Joseph Chang as Fang Yi-Jen 
 Hsu Wei-ning as Hsu Hai-Yin 
 Shih-hsien Wang as Chao Cheng-Kuan 
 Ruby Lin as Li Ya-Jun 
 River Huang as Yu Cheng-Hao 
  as Chiang Hsiao-Meng, Fang Yi-Jen's daughter
 Ning Ding as Su Ko-Yun
 Chia-Kuei Chen as Chang Tsung-Chien
 Rexen Cheng as Chuang Ping-Yao
 Joseph Hsia as Liu Kuang-Yung
 Zhang-xing Chang as Liao
 Sheng-te Hong as Sun Yung-Chen
 Hao-zhe Lai as Fatso
 Bruce Chen as Ta-Tse
 Diane Lin as Chou Yu-hsuan
 Nien-hsien Ma as Chen Yao-Hui
 Chin Chi as Lin Yu-Jung, Kuang-Yung's wife
 Han Chang as forensic science teacher
 Peter Tseng as Fang Yi-Jen (age 18)
 Yiin-shang Liu as Tsou Yueh-Huan, Ko-Yun's mother
 Grace Ko as Legislator Chien Shu-Fei
 Chiung-tzu Chang as Chen Li-Chi
 Helen Hsu as Chiang Jo-ying, Yi-Jen's wife
 Chiung-hsuan Hsieh as Wu Fang-Ning, Cheng-Kuan's wife
 Tsai-Yi Huang as Chang Hsin
 Jau-der Yin as Chou Yang

ReleaseThe Victims' Game was released on April 30, 2020 on Netflix.

SoundtrackThe Victims' Game Original Soundtrack (OST) (誰是被害者-影集原聲帶) was released on May 1, 2020 by various artists. It contains a total of 4 tracks. The OST album is available for streaming on various music streaming platforms including but not limited to Spotify, Apple Music and YouTube Music.

Track listingEveryone Is A Ghost - Single (每個人都是鬼 《誰是被害者》Netflix 原創影集 宣傳曲) was released on April 30, 2020 by Ann Hsu. It contains a total of 2 tracks. The single is available for streaming on various music streaming platforms including but not limited to Spotify, Apple Music and YouTube Music.

Track listingStill Alive - Single'' (還活著 - Netflix原創影集《誰是被害者》插曲) was released on May 1, 2020 by Salsa Chen. It contains a total of 1 track. The single is available for streaming on various music streaming platforms including but not limited to Spotify, Apple Music and YouTube Music.

Track listing

Awards and nominations

References

External links
 
 

Mandarin-language Netflix original programming
Taiwanese drama television series
2020 Taiwanese television series debuts
Asperger syndrome
Autism in television
Thriller television series